The men's 50 metre rifle prone was a shooting sports event held as part of the shooting programme of the 1956 Summer Olympics. It was the eighth appearance of the event. The competition was held on 5 December 1956 at the shooting ranges in Melbourne. 44 shooters from 25 nations competed.

Results

References

Shooting at the 1956 Summer Olympics
Men's 050m prone 1956